Jean Borotra and Jacques Brugnon successfully defended their title, defeating Ryosuke Nunoi and Jiro Sato in the final, 4–6, 6–3, 6–3, 7–5 to win the gentlemen's doubles tennis title at the 1933 Wimbledon Championship.

Seeds

  Jean Borotra /  Jacques Brugnon (champions)
  Keith Gledhill /  Ellsworth Vines (first round)
  Pat Hughes /  Fred Perry (quarterfinals)
  Norman Farquharson /  Vernon Kirby (semifinals)

Draw

Finals

Top half

Section 1

Section 2

Bottom half

Section 3

Section 4

The nationality of M Benavitch is unknown.

References

External links

Men's Doubles
Wimbledon Championship by year – Men's doubles